Mark Gee (born May 19, 1973, in Newcastle upon Tyne, England), better known as Huck Gee, is a contemporary artist, illustrator, toy maker, and designer best known by toy enthusiasts for his iconic "Skullhead" character. He works and lives in San Francisco, California.

Work
Influenced by Japanese and Hong Kong pop art, Huck produces illustrations and custom figures and has released production toys through Kidrobot including figures for The Standard and DJ Qbert. In 2005, Huck Gee released the "Skullhead Project", a joint project between Kidrobot and Barneys New York in conjunction with five top fashion designers: Marc Jacobs, Jil Sander, Dries van Noten, Rick Owens, and Duckie Brown. With this project, 12" figures of Huck's Skullhead character came immaculately dressed in the 2005 spring collections of each of the five fashion designers.

In October 2007, Gee's second original figure, "Akuma Bomb" was released. In the winter of 2007, three Kidrobot toys were accepted into the permanent collection of the Museum of Modern Art in New York City, including a "Hello My Name Is" 8" Dunny, designed by Gee with Paul Budnitz and Tristan Eaton. Huck has also consigned several pieces for one of the world's leading fine art auction houses: Christie's Auction House.

In the Fall of 2009 Huck participated in the, Sanrio hosted, 35th Anniversary celebration for Hello Kitty called Three Apples. Three Apples was a multi-dimensional exhibition and celebration of all things Hello Kitty.

In 2010, Huck collaborated with rally racer and co-founder of DC shoes, Ken Block. A version of Huck's famous "Skullhead" was designed as a logo for  Block's Monster World Rally Team WRC entitled "Blockhead". The logo shows Ken's number "43″ implanted on the forehead of a "squared" skull.
In the Spring of 2010, the creators at United Front Games asked Huck to feature in an "Artist Spotlight" for the game ModNation.

In 2006 Huck's toys appeared in the book, Dot Dot Dash: Designer Toys, Action Figures, and Character Art and in the book, I Am Plastic {by Paul Budnitz}.

In 2007 his toys appeared in the book, ToyGiants {by Daniel & Geo Fuchs}. 

In 2010 his toys appeared in the book, Flux: Designer Toys {by Shawn Wright}, and in the book, I Am Plastic Too {by Paul Budnitz}.

In 2014 Huck participated in the "This is Not a Toy" exhibit at the Design Exchange Museum Canada in Toronto, ON. It was the first major exhibit of designer urban toys worldwide and guest curated by Pharrell Williams. Huck's work can be found in the editorial companion to the exhibit, titled by the same name, "This is Not a Toy".

In 2015, Huck revealed that he has severed ties with Kidrobot and has his own toy platform in production called The Blank.

In 2017, Huck Gee Inc. ended and released its final self-produced release.

References

External links
Huck Gee – Vinyl Creep
Huck Gee – Trampt

Living people
1973 births
British contemporary artists
British designers
Artists from Newcastle upon Tyne
Artists from California